Amniscus praemorsus is a species of longhorn beetle of the subfamily Lamiinae. It was described by Johan Christian Fabricius in 1792 and is known from Mexico and the West Indies.

References

Beetles described in 1792
Acanthocinini